Isfahan City Center is a large commercial and entertainment complex in Isfahan, Iran. As of November 2012, it was the second largest shopping mall (after Iran Mall ) in Iran, and one of the largest shopping malls in the world.

History 
The mall was developed by Masoud Sarrami through his firm, Prestige Land Iran Co. Sarrami was confident that the venture would succeed, being cautiously hopeful in 2016 that the sanctions against Iran would eventually be lifted. He even toyed with the idea of attracting Donald Trump to invest in the hotel aspect of the project.

Description 

The mall is located near the city of Isfahan and the towns of Sepahan Shahr and Baharestan.

Gallery

See also
List of largest shopping malls

References 

Tourist attractions in Isfahan
Shopping malls in Iran
Shopping malls established in 2012
Buildings and structures in Isfahan
Architecture in Iran
Entertainment venues in Iran
[[Category:ICCMTU NGO ]]